Ana Kačarević (born 18 June 1984) is a Serbian handballer player for ŽRK Izvor and the Serbian national team.

References

1984 births
Living people
Serbian female handball players
People from Kladovo
Mediterranean Games gold medalists for Serbia
Competitors at the 2013 Mediterranean Games
Mediterranean Games medalists in handball